Ognjen Škorić (born 2 March 1993) is a Bosnian footballer who plays for FK Jedinstvo Žeravica in the Second League of the Republika Srpska.

Club career
Born in Gradiška, Bosnia and Herzegovina, after playing with FK Kozara Gradiška in the 2011–12 Premier League of Bosnia and Herzegovina, in January 2013 Škorić signed with FK Donji Srem and played with them in the 2012–13 Serbian SuperLiga.

In January 2015, after making a good first half of the 2014–15 season with Kozara, Škorić signed with Bosnian Premier League side FK Radnik Bijeljina.

He rejoined Kozara from Borac Banja Luka in January 2017.

International career
In 2009 Škorić played for Bosnia and Herzegovina U-17 team.

More recently, in 2014, Ognjen Škorić was part of the Republika Srpska national under-23 football team.

References

1993 births
Living people
People from Gradiška, Bosnia and Herzegovina
Serbs of Bosnia and Herzegovina
Association football wingers
Bosnia and Herzegovina footballers
Bosnia and Herzegovina youth international footballers
FK Kozara Gradiška players
FK Donji Srem players
FK Radnik Bijeljina players
FK Tekstilac Derventa players
FK Borac Banja Luka players
Premier League of Bosnia and Herzegovina players
Serbian SuperLiga players
Bosnia and Herzegovina expatriate footballers
Expatriate footballers in Serbia
Bosnia and Herzegovina expatriate sportspeople in Serbia